Auguste Aymard (5 December 1808 – 26 June 1889) was a French prehistorian and palaeontologist who lived and died in Puy-en-Velay (Haute-Loire). He described the fossil Entelodon magnus and the fossil genera Anancus and Amphechinus.
Auguste Aymard  was the archivist  for the Departement  Haute-Loire and Conservateur of Musée du Puy-en-Velay. He made archaeological discoveries in Puy-en-Velay, Polignac, Haute-Loire and Espaly-Saint-Marcel.

Works
 Aymard, A., 1848, Essai monographique sur un nouveau genre de Mammifère fossile trouvé dans la Haute-Loire, et nommé Entélodon, Annales de la Société d’Agriculture Sciences, Arts et Commerce du Puy, Vol.12, 1848, pp. 227–268
 Aymard, A. 1854, Acquisitions d’ossements fossiles trouvés à Sainzelle, commune de Polignac; aperçu descriptif sur ce curieux gisement et détermination des espèces fossiles qu’il renferme, Annales de la Société d’Agriculture Sciences, Arts et Commerce du Puy, Vol. 18, 1854, pp. 51–54
 Aymard, A. 1854, Des terrains fossilifères du bassin supérieur de la Loire, Comptes Rendus des Séances de l’Académie des Sciences, Paris, Vol. 38, 1854, pp. 673–677

References
Auguste Aymard (1808-1889), pionnier de la science moderne, exposition aux Archives départementales, 26 mars - 26 avril 1990 / Centre Culturel Départemental, Conseil Général de la Haute-Loire.

French paleontologists
French archaeologists
1889 deaths
1808 births
People from Le Puy-en-Velay